Stylianos Schicho (born 1977 in Vienna) is an Austrian painter.

Life 

Schicho studied between 1998 and 2005 under Wolfgang Herzig at the University for Applied Arts.

Harwig Knack, curator of the Kunsthalle Krems, wrote about his paintings:

Perception, surveillance, observation and observation of oneself plays a key role in the work of Stylianos Schicho. He is concerned with exploring "observation and surveillance spaces", especially those created by cameras. The graduate of the University of Applied Arts uses the classical perspective of the surveillance camera as a stylistic device in his monumental paintings. He poses the question as to the relationship between observer and observed. He also throws a critical glance at the discussion in the wake of 9/11, which has increasingly become the focus of public attention.

Exhibitions

2009 

 For Security Reasons, Showroom MAMA, Rotterdam/NL 
 Pilotenküche ganz und gar, Leipzig/Baumwollspinnerei, Group Exhibition
 Flavors of Austria TAF the Art Foundation, Athens/GR, Group Exhibition

2008 

 Galerie Feichtner, Wien, "All you can eat", Solo Exhibition
 Pilotenküche, Leipzig/Baumwollspinnerei, Group Exhibition

2007 

 Galerie Feichtner, Wien, "Latest Works", Group Exhibition
 Museum Moderner Kunst, Wien, Stiftung Ludwig, Walter Koschatzky Kunstpreis 2007 - Ausstellung der nominierten Werke
 Galerie Frey, Wien, "RED", Group Exhibition

2006 

 Kunsthalle Krems, "REAL", Group Exhibition
 Kunsthalle Krems, "Der beobachtete Beobachter", Solo Exhibition
 "Strange Cargo", Museumsquartier Wien, quartier21, Group Exhibition
 Galerie Lisi Hämmerle, Bregenz, "Christian Eisenberger – Dies ist doch kein Porno", Group Exhibition
 "Economy Class", Alliance française de Nairobi, Nairobi/Kenya - Österreichische Botschaft, Group Exhibition

2005 

 Galerie Frey, Wien, "New Perspectives", Group Exhibition

Collections 

 2008 Collection of the city Vienna, Musa, Vienna/AT
 2007 Collection Leopold Museum, Vienna/AT
 2005 Art Collection, University of Applied Arts, Vienna/AT
 2001 Ternitz Art Collection /AT

Awards 

 2009 Grand Prix of the 1st Danube Biennale, Danubiana Meulensteen Art Museum, Bratislava
 2007 Artprize of Pöchlarn/AT 
 2007 Walter Koschatzky Artprice 
 2004 Sophie und Emanuel Fohn scholarship
 2004 Artprize of Ternitz/AT

External links 
 Official Website
 Biography
 Entry in recognized artist database Basis Wien
 Entry in recognized artist database artfacts
 Cast your Art September 2008 - Text und Video artistportrait

References 

1977 births
Living people
Austrian male painters
University of Applied Arts Vienna alumni
21st-century Austrian painters
21st-century male artists
Artists from Vienna